Corey Mapes (born June 22, 1992) is a German professional ice hockey player. He currently plays for the Kassel Huskies in the DEL2. After playing as a youth and making his professional debut within Adler Mannheim, Mapes was signed to a one-year contract with DEL rival Düsseldorfer EG on May 22, 2013.

After three seasons within the Düsseldorfer organization, Mapes was left uncontracted as a free agent, and signed a one-year deal with DEL2 club, Kassel Huskies on June 22, 2016.

Career statistics

Regular season and playoffs

International

References

External links
 

1992 births
Living people
Adler Mannheim players
Düsseldorfer EG players
German ice hockey defencemen
Heilbronner Falken players
Sportspeople from Heilbronn